Thomas Frederick Westwick (June 28, 1887 – December 15, 1963) was a Canadian professional ice hockey player. He played five professional seasons for the Ottawa Senators and the Quebec Bulldogs from 1909 until 1916. His brother Harry was also a professional ice hockey player.

Playing career
Born in Ottawa, Ontario, Westwick first played senior-level hockey with the Ottawa Hockey Club in 1906–07, although he only started in one game. In 1907–08, he played for the Ottawa Emmetts of the Ottawa City Hockey League. The following season he turned professional, playing for the Duquesne Athletic Club of the Western Pennsylvania Hockey League (WPHL). He was out of professional hockey until 1912–13 when he returned to Ottawa to play for the Senators. He switched to the Bulldogs for the 1913–14 season and played two seasons with Quebec before retiring. He died on December 15, 1963.

References

Bibliography

Notes

1887 births
1963 deaths
Duquesne Athletic Club players
Ice hockey people from Ottawa
Ottawa Senators (NHA) players
Quebec Bulldogs (NHA) players
Canadian ice hockey right wingers
Westwick family